This is a list of notable schools in Botswana, organized by the country's administrative districts.

Francistown 
 Francistown Senior Secondary School
 John Mackenzie School
 [[Mater Spei Collage
 [[Eaten gate acdamy

Gaborone 
 Botho University
 Maru a Pula School
 St. Joseph's College, Kgale
 Westwood International School
 Rainbow High School
 Botswana Accountancy College
 University of Botswana
 Limkokwing University of Creative Technology
 University of Agriculture and Natural Resources 
 Naledi Senior Secondary School
Gaborone Senior Secondary School
Gaborone International School(GIS)

Lobatse
 Lobatse Senior Secondary School
Itireleng Community Junior Secondary School
Ipelegeng Community Junior Secondary School
Letsopa Community Junior Secondary School
 Crescent School

North-East District
 Masunga Senior Secondary School

See also 

 Education in Botswana

References

External links
 Botswana Examination Council
 Botswana Junior Secondary Schools

Schools
Schools
Schools
Botswana

Botswana